Kim Abrams is a rock drummer (formerly Keith Abrams), known mostly for her work with Time of Orchids and PAK. She was a frequent collaborator both with Ron Anderson and Jesse Krakow.

Abrams was recruited, along with Jesse Krakow, into Time of Orchids in 1999. In 2003, PAK's bassist Krakow asked band leader Ron Anderson to audition Abrams for PAK - Abrams impressed Anderson with her ability to play a difficult passage, without warming up, much faster than its regular tempo, and so she was admitted to the band. Most recently she has joined fellow PAK member Tim Byrnes in Kayo Dot. Following 2016's release Plastic House on Base of Sky they left the band and drumming and began to release minimal techno music made almost completely with analog equipment and minimal editing/overdubs.

Discography

with Time Of Orchids
 Melonwhisper (2001)
 Much Too Much Fun (2003)
 Early as Seen in Pace (2004)

with PAK
 Motel (2005)
 The Ashfield Sessions
 Secret Curve (2011)

with Hybegnu
 Hybegnu

with Giggle the Ozone
 Order

with Kayo Dot
 Gamma Knife (2012)
 Hubardo (2013)
 Coffins on Io (2014)
 Plastic House on Base of Sky (2016)

with Fotgjengeren
 Distained and Untwined (2014)

with Infantephant (on bass guitar)
 Cyclelicoptippopacalypse (2013)

with Psalm Zero
 Sparta (2020)

as BOLKENYOLTE
 PreDeter (2017)

as KM Abrams
 All Set (EP) (2018)
 Rename/Replace (2020)

References

Living people
Rock drummers
Year of birth missing (living people)
Place of birth missing (living people)
Nationality missing